Taba is an Egyptian town near the northern tip of the Gulf of Aqaba. Taba is the location of Egypt's busiest border crossing with neighboring Eilat, Israel. Taba was originally developed as a tourist destination by the Israelis with the first hotel opening there in the 1960s, and today it is a frequent vacation spot for Egyptians and other tourists, especially those from Israel on their way to other destinations in Egypt or as a weekend getaway. It is the northernmost resort of Egypt's Red Sea Riviera.

History
The Taba Crisis of 1906 started when Sultan Abdul Hamid II of the Ottoman Empire decided to build a post at Taba. The British sent an Egyptian Coast Guard steamer to re-occupy Naqb el Aqaba and Taba. When encountered by a Turkish officer who refused them permission to land, the Egyptian force landed on the nearby Pharaoh's Island instead. The British Navy sent warships into the eastern Mediterranean and threatened to seize certain islands under the Ottoman Empire. The Sultan agreed to evacuate Taba and on 13 May 1906. The border was initially marked with telegraph poles and these were later replaced by boundary pillars.

Taba was located on the Egyptian side of the armistice line agreed to in 1949.  During the Suez Crisis in 1956 it was briefly occupied by Israel but returned to Egypt when the country withdrew in 1957.  Israel reoccupied the Sinai Peninsula after the Six-Day War in 1967, and subsequently, a 400-room hotel was built in Taba. Following the 1979 Israeli-Egyptian peace treaty, Egypt and Israel were negotiating the exact position of the border, Israel claimed that Taba had been on the Ottoman side of a border agreed between the Ottomans and British Egypt in 1906 and had, therefore, been in error in its two previous agreements.  After a long dispute, the issue was submitted to an international commission composed of one Israeli, one Egyptian, and three outsiders.

Both parties agreed that all maps since 1915, except for one 1916 Turkish-German map, show Taba on the Egyptian side and that no dispute had previously been raised on the issue in the intervening years. However, Israel contended that errors had been made when the telegraph poles were replaced by boundary pillars in 1906–1907 and that the written 1906 agreement rather than its demarcation with boundary pillars was the legal border. The commission did not accept that the boundary pillars were in error but in any case held that a demarcated boundary accepted by all parties for such a long time had achieved legal status. Based on the wording of the Egypt-Israel peace treaty, the commission ruled that the accepted border during the Mandate period was the one that counted, though it did not accept that that border was different from the earlier border. Of special concern was the final boundary pillar near the Gulf of Aqaba, which had disappeared. There are early photographs of a pillar north-east of Taba, but Israel contended that it had been placed in error. The commission did not accept Israel's case and positioned the pillar close to its historical location.

Therefore, Israel and Egypt resumed negotiations which ended in February 1989 and as a result, Taba was returned to Egypt, Hosni Mubarak raised the Egyptian flag on the town on the 19th of March 1989.

As part of this subsequent agreement, travelers are permitted to cross from Israel at the Eilat–Taba border checkpoint, and visit the "Aqaba Coast Area of Sinai", (stretching from Taba down to Sharm el Sheikh, and including Nuweiba, Saint Catherine's Monastery, and Dahab), visa-free for up to 14 days, making Taba a popular tourist destination. It features several large hotels, including the Hyatt Regency, Marriott, Sofitel, and Intercontinental. It is also a significant diving area where many people come to either free dive, scuba dive, or learn to dive via the many diving courses available. Other recreation facilities include a new desert-style golf course.

On 24 September 1995 the Taba Agreement was signed by Israel and the PLO in Taba.

On October 7, 2004, the Hilton Taba was hit by a bomb that killed 34 people including several Israelis. Twenty-four days later, an inquiry by the Egyptian Interior Ministry into the bombings concluded that the perpetrators received no external help but were aided by Bedouins on the peninsula.

In February 2014, a coach taking tourists to Saint Catherine's Monastery in Sinai exploded in Taba shortly before crossing the border to Israel. At least two South Koreans were killed and 14 injured. The blast was blamed on  terrorists.

Despite warnings, tourism from Israel to Taba was up in 2016 with many traveling to enjoy the northernmost Red Sea resort.

Climate 
Köppen-Geiger climate classification system classifies its climate as hot desert (BWh), as the rest of Egypt.

Taba heights' temperatures are slightly cooler and it has slightly more rainy days. It receives slightly less sunshine.

Taba Protected Area 

Located just southwest of Taba is a  protected area, including geological formations such as caves, a string of valleys, and  mountainous passages. There are also some natural springs in the area. The area has 25 species of mammals, 50 species of rare birds, and 24 species of reptiles.

Transportation 

Since Taba existed only as a small Bedouin village, there was never any real transportation infrastructure. More recently, Al Nakb Airport, located on the Sinai plateau some 35 km (22 mi) from Taba, was upgraded and renamed Taba International Airport (IATA: TCP, ICAO: HETB), and now handles half a dozen charter flights a week from the UK as well as weekly charter flights from Belgium, Russia, Denmark, and The Netherlands. Many tourists enter via the Taba Border Crossing from Eilat, Israel and a marina has been built in the new Taba Heights development, some 20 km (12 mi) south of Taba, and which has frequent ferry sailings to Aqaba in Jordan, although these are restricted to tourists on organised tours.

Gallery

See also 
 Taba Border Crossing
 Taba International Airport
 Ras Muhammad National Park
 Taba Summit
 Taba Agreement
 2004 Sinai bombings
 Hilton Taba
 Cultural tourism in Egypt

References

External links 

 Photographical Impressions 
 Taba at Google Earth
 Orascom Development (Taba Heights)

National parks of Egypt
Populated coastal places in Egypt
Underwater diving sites in Egypt
Populated places in South Sinai Governorate
Tourism in Egypt
Red Sea
Egypt–Israel border crossings
Former Israeli settlements in Sinai
Seaside resorts in Egypt
Tourist attractions in Egypt